Intramembranous ossification is one of the two essential processes during fetal development of the gnathostome (excluding chondrichthyans such as sharks) skeletal system by which rudimentary bone tissue is created.
Intramembranous ossification is also an essential process during the natural healing of bone fractures and the rudimentary formation of bones of the head.

Unlike endochondral ossification, which is the other process by which bone tissue is created during fetal development, cartilage is not present during intramembranous ossification.

Formation of woven bone
Mesenchymal stem cells within mesenchyme or the medullary cavity of a bone fracture initiate the process of intramembranous ossification. A mesenchymal stem cell, or MSC, is an unspecialized cell that can develop into an osteoblast. Before it begins to develop, the morphological characteristics of a MSC are: A small cell body with a few cell processes that are long and thin; a large, round nucleus with a prominent nucleolus that is surrounded by finely dispersed chromatin particles, giving the nucleus a clear appearance; and a small amount of Golgi apparatus, rough endoplasmic reticulum, mitochondria, and polyribosomes. Furthermore, the mesenchymal stem cells are widely dispersed within an extracellular matrix that is devoid of every type of collagen, except for a few reticular fibrils.

The process of intramembranous ossification starts when a small group of adjacent MSCs begin to replicate and form a small, dense cluster of cells that is called a nidus. Once a nidus has been formed the MSCs within it stop replicating.
At this point, morphological changes in the MSCs begin to occur: The cell body is now larger and rounder; the long, thin cell processes are no longer present; and the amount of Golgi apparatus and rough endoplasmic reticulum increases. Eventually, all of the cells within the nidus develop into, and display the morphologic characteristics of, an osteoprogenitor cell.

 changes in the morphology of the osteoprogenitor cells occur: Their shape becomes more columnar and the amount of Golgi apparatus and rough endoplasmic reticulum increases. Eventually, all of the cells within the nidus develop into, and display the morphologic characteristics of, an osteoblast.
Then the osteoblasts create an extracellular matrix containing Type-I collagen fibrils, which is osteoid. The osteoblasts, while lining the periphery of the nidus, continue to form osteoid in the center of the nidus. Some of the osteoblasts become incorporated within the osteoid to become osteocytes.

At this point, the osteoid becomes mineralized resulting in a nidus consisting of mineralized osteoid that contains osteocytes and is lined by active osteoblasts. The nidus, that began as a diffuse collection of MSCs, has developed into woven bone, the most rudimentary bone tissue.

Formation of lamellar bone
The first step in the process is the formation of bone spicules which eventually fuse with each other and become trabeculae. The periosteum is formed and bone growth continues at the surface of trabeculae. Much like spicules, the increasing growth of trabeculae result in interconnection and this network is called woven bone. Eventually, woven bone is replaced by lamellar bone.

Formation of bone spicules
Embryologic mesenchymal cells (MSC) condense into layers of vascularized primitive connective tissue. Certain  mesenchymal cells group together, usually near or around blood vessels, and differentiate into osteogenic cells which deposit bone matrix constitutively. These aggregates of bony matrix are called bone spicules. Separate mesenchymal cells differentiate into osteoblasts, which line up along the surface of the spicule and secrete more osteoid, which increases the size of the spicule.

Formation of trabecular bone
As the spicules continue to grow, they fuse with adjacent spicules and this results in the formation of trabeculae. When osteoblasts become trapped in the matrix they secrete, they differentiate into osteocytes. Osteoblasts continue to line up on the surface which increases the size. As growth continues, trabeculae become interconnected and trabecular bone is formed. The term primary spongiosa is also used to refer to the initial trabecular network.

Primary centre of ossification
The periosteum is formed around the trabeculae by differentiating mesenchymal cells. The primary center of ossification is the area where bone growth occurs between the periosteum and the bone. Osteogenic cells that originate from the periosteum increase appositional growth and a bone collar is formed. The bone collar is eventually mineralized and lamellar bone is formed.

Formation of osteon
Osteons are components or principal structures of compact bone. During the formation of bone spicules, cytoplasmic processes from osteoblasts interconnect. This becomes the canaliculi of osteons. Since bone spicules tend to form around blood vessels, the perivascular space is greatly reduced as the bone continues to grow. When replacement to compact bone occurs, this blood vessel becomes the central canal of the osteon.

Examples in the human body 
The following bones develop in humans via Intramembranous ossification: 
 Flat bones of the face
 Most of the bones of the skull
 Clavicles

Other bone that formed by intramembranous ossification are: cortices of tubular and flat bones as well as the calvaria, upper facial bones, tympanic temporal bone, vomer, and medial pterygoid process.

See also 
Ossification

Footnotes

References

 

Vertebrate developmental biology
Skeletal system

de:Ossifikation#Desmale Ossifikation